Al-Qāʾim, al-Qaim, or al-Ḳāʾim ("the riser") may refer to:

People
 al-Qāʾim Āl Muḥammad, a messiah-like figure in Shi'a Islam, similar to the Mahdi
 People with full name or honorific al-Qāʾim bi-amr Allāh  ("the one raised by [or 'who carries out'] God's order"):
 Muhammad al-Mahdi (869–?), 12th Shia imam, also called Muhammad al-Qa'im
 al-Qa'im (Fatimid caliph) (r.934–946), the second Fatimid caliph in Ifriqiya 
 al-Qa'im (Abbasid caliph at Baghdad) (1031–1075), son of al-Qadir  
Muhammad ibn al-Qa'im, 11th century Abbasid prince and father of caliph Al-Muqtadi.
 Abu Abdullah Muhammad ibn Faraj, rival sultan to Muhammad IV of Granada in 1327
 al-Qa'im (Abbasid caliph at Cairo) (f. 1451–1455), caliph under Mamluk authority
 Abu Abdallah al-Qaim (fl. 1509–1517), ruler of Sous in Morocco

Places
 Al-Qa'im District, a district of Iraq
 Al-Qa'im (town), a town situated in the above district
 Al-Qa'im border crossing, between Syria and Iraq